This is a list of events in British radio during 1996.

Events

January
No events.

February
4 February – Trevor Nelson joins BBC Radio 1 to present the UK's first national R&B show Rhythm Nation.
5 February – Radio Wyvern becomes the last commercial radio station in England to end simulcasting on FM and AM.

March
15 March – Alan Freeman joins Virgin Radio to present a new Friday night rock show.
18 March – Mike Read replaces Nick Bailey as host of Classic FM’s breakfast show.
30 March – Steve Wright joins BBC Radio 2.
31 March – Michael Parkinson begins presenting Parkinson's Sunday Supplement on Radio 2.
March
Jim Moir replaces Frances Line as controller of BBC Radio 2 and begins repositioning the station to attract a wider audience of over 35s, many of whom have moved to commercial radio following the repositioning of BBC Radio 1 three years earlier. He introduces a daytime playlist consisting of AOR/contemporary music with specialist programmes airing during the evening and at the weekend. Nostalgic/easy listening music is restricted to Sundays only.
BBC Dorset FM closes and is replaced by a rebroadcast of BBC Radio Solent with localised news bulletins.
 Allied Radio plc is taken over by Independent Radio Group plc.

April
1 April – Network News closes.
3 April – After 18 years, the name BBC Radio Manchester returns to the airwaves. Since 1988 the station had been called BBC GMR. Shortly after the namechange, the station opens a relay on 104.6 FM to give areas of the Upper Tame Valley, including Saddleworth, Tameside and down to Hyde, improved coverage.
5–8 April – Classic FM broadcasts its first Hall of Fame over the Easter weekend.
9 April – BBC Radio Oxford and BBC Radio Berkshire are merged to form BBC Thames Valley FM.

May
4 May – BBC Radio 3 commences 24-hour transmission.
 May – Viva 963 is sold to Mohammed Al Fayed, owner of Harrods and chairman of Fulham Football Club, who renames the station as Liberty Radio.

June
June – Radio 1 starts live streaming on the internet.
June – Schools programmes are broadcast during the day for the final time. Schools programmes continued to be  broadcast overnight until 2003.

July
1 July – The LBC name returns to London's airwaves following a rebrand of London News Radio's MW station News Talk 1152.
9 July – The Radio Authority receives 25 bids for the final FM citywide London licence. In November the Authority announces that XFM has been awarded the licence which will broadcast on 104.9.

August
Hallam FM switches off its transmitter covering Rotherham as part of its licence agreement.
Minster FM extends northwards when it switches on a transmitter covering Thirsk and Northallerton.

September
9 September – Following a change in ownership, Manchester station Fortune 1458 is relaunched as Lite AM.
27 September – Paul Gambaccini leaves BBC Radio 3 after less than a year with the station.
30 September – Belfast Community Radio closes and is replaced by CityBeat.
September
Scottish Radio Holdings purchases Northern Ireland stations Downtown Radio and Cool FM.
The Radio Authority awards a full-time commercial licence to a student radio station for the first time when it awards the Oxford licence to Oxygen FM.

October
9 October – BBC Radio 1's London studios move from Egton House to Yalding House.
October – Richard Skinner, who presented the first show on Virgin Radio, leaves.

November
4 November – The Asian Network expands into a full-time station when it increases the number of hours on air from 80 hours a week to 126 hours a week (18 hours a day). The station, which broadcasts on the MW frequencies of BBC Radio Leicester and BBC WM, is renamed BBC Asian Network.
14 November – London News relaunches its rolling news service as News Direct 97.3.

December
20 December – Steve Penk leaves Key 103 to move to Capital FM after 18 years at the Manchester station.

Unknown
Matthew Bannister becomes Director of BBC Radio.
Following its purchase of Bedford station Chiltern 96.9, new owners GWR Group rebrand the station as B97 FM.

Station debuts
5 February – Wyvern FM and Wyvern AM
Spring – Burn FM
4 April – 96.4 The Eagle
9 April – BBC Thames Valley FM
21 April – Spirit FM
24 May – FM102 The Bear
3 June – Asian Sound Radio
15 July – Oban FM
29 September – The Beach
23 November – Valleys Radio
Unknown date – Fly Live

Closing this year
9 April – 
BBC Radio Berkshire (1992–1996)
BBC Radio Oxford (1970–1996)
1 September – Supergold (1988–1996)

Programme debuts
 17 April – Chambers on BBC Radio 4 (1996–1999)
 July – Comedy Quiz on BBC Radio 4 (1996–1997)
 6 October – The David Jacobs Collection on BBC Radio 2 (1996–2013)
 Unknown – Parkinson's Sunday Supplement (1996–2007)

Continuing radio programmes

1940s
 Sunday Half Hour (1940–2018)
 Desert Island Discs (1942–Present)
 Letter from America (1946–2004)
 Woman's Hour (1946–Present)
 A Book at Bedtime (1949–Present)

1950s
 The Archers (1950–Present)
 The Today Programme (1957–Present)
 Sing Something Simple (1959–2001)
 Your Hundred Best Tunes (1959–2007)

1960s
 Farming Today (1960–Present)
 In Touch (1961–Present)
 The World at One (1965–Present)
 The Official Chart (1967–Present)
 Just a Minute (1967–Present)
 The Living World (1968–Present)
 The Organist Entertains (1969–2018)

1970s
 PM (1970–Present)
 Start the Week (1970–Present)
 Week Ending (1970–1998)
 You and Yours (1970–Present)
 I'm Sorry I Haven't a Clue (1972–Present)
 Good Morning Scotland (1973–Present)
 Kaleidoscope (1973–1998)
 Newsbeat (1973–Present)
 The News Huddlines (1975–2001)
 File on 4 (1977–Present)
 Money Box (1977–Present)
 The News Quiz (1977–Present)
 Breakaway (1979–1998)
 Feedback (1979–Present)
 The Food Programme (1979–Present)
 Science in Action (1979–Present)

1980s
 In Business (1983–Present)
 Sounds of the 60s (1983–Present)
 Loose Ends (1986–Present)

1990s
 The Moral Maze (1990–Present)
 Essential Selection (1991–Present)
 No Commitments (1992–2007)
 Harry Hill's Fruit Corner (1993–1997)
 The Pepsi Chart (1993–2002)
 Wake Up to Wogan (1993–2009)
 Essential Mix (1993–Present)
 Up All Night (1994–Present)
 Wake Up to Money (1994–Present)
 Collins and Maconie's Hit Parade (1994–1997)
 Julie Enfield Investigates (1994–1999)
 Private Passions (1995–Present)

Ending this year
 January – Change at Oglethorpe (1995–1996)
 September – The Mark Steel Solution (1992–1996)

Deaths
26 March – John Snagge, 91, newsreader
6 April – Gordon Clough, 61, radio journalist
29 April – David Davis, 87, radio executive and broadcaster
11 May – Joan Thirkettle, 48, television journalist and radio personality
7 June – Percy Edwards, 88, animal impersonator
19 June – Vivian Ellis, 92, theme tune composer (My Word, Paul Temple)
11 December – Willie Rushton, 59, comic performer, broadcast personality and cartoonist
14 December – Norman Hackforth, 87, musical accompanist and radio "mystery voice"

See also 
 1996 in British music
 1996 in British television
 1996 in the United Kingdom
 List of British films of 1996

References

Radio
British Radio, 1996 In
Years in British radio